The Geological Museum (originally the Museum of Economic Geology then the Museum of Practical Geology), started in 1835 as one of the oldest single science museums in the world and now part of the Natural History Museum in London. It transferred from Jermyn Street to Exhibition Road, South Kensington in 1935 in a building designed by Sir Richard Allison and John Hatton Markham of the Office of Works.

History
The Museum of Practical Geology was established in 1837 in a building at 6 Craig's Court, Whitehall, at the suggestion of Henry de la Beche, the first director general of the Geological Survey. The museum's library was founded by de la Beche in 1843, mainly by donation from his own library. Initially under the Ordnance Survey, the museum administration moved to the Department of Woods and Forests in 1845.

Jermyn Street
Larger premises soon became necessary, and a design for a new building was commissioned from James Pennethorne. This, built on a long narrow site with frontages in Piccadilly and Jermyn Street, housed the galleries, as well as a library, a 500-seat lecture theatre, offices and laboratories. It was constructed between 1845 and 1849, and was opened by Prince Albert on May 14, 1851.

The purpose of the museum, as summarised in the Descriptive Guide, published in 1867, was:

to exhibit the rocks minerals, and organic remains, illustrating the maps and sections of the Geological Survey of the United Kingdom: also to exemplify the applications of the Mineral productions of these Islands to the uses of purposes of use and ornament

The collections were accordingly arranged in two main sections covering natural materials found in the United Kingdom, and industrial products made from them. There were three secondary sections, covering mechanical appliances used to process raw materials, specimens of historical products, and foreign materials imported in their raw state. The museum also included maps, mosaics, glass, pottery, and busts of prominent geologists and scientists, including William Smith and James Hall.

In the summer of 1933, the Geological Museum, still at its old location, was the focus of worldwide attention when it served as the venue of the London Economic Conference, bringing together the representatives of 66 nations in a failed effort to end the then-prevalent global depression.

Exhibition Road
The museum was reopened by the then Duke of York in July 1935, after the completion of the new building on Exhibition Road in South Kensington two years prior. The cost of the new building was stated at around £220,000 by the First Commissioner of Works.  Following the move, the museum became well known for the many dioramas (three-dimensional paintings) used to interpret geology and one or two mining techniques. These have largely been dismantled since the Natural History Museum took over the museum in 1986.

In 1965, the museum was merged with the British Geological Survey and Overseas Geological Surveys, under the name "Institute of Geological Sciences". In 1971 the museum employed the late designer James Gardner to design and produce The Story of the Earth, which was acknowledged as a significant breakthrough in science museum design and critically acclaimed and imitated worldwide. It was opened by Queen Elizabeth II and became well known for the huge reproduction of a rock face, cast from site in Scotland, and for its planetarium, active volcano model and earthquake machine.

Between 1971 and 1974 the museum formed its own design team which, working closely with the scientists and technicians, produced a series of temporary and permanent exhibitions starting with the re-presentation of the gem collection and then, with a design team led by Giles Velarde (Head of Exhibition Design from 1974 to 1988), produced Early Days of Geology in Britain, Black Gold, Britain Before Man, Journey to the Planets, British Fossils, Pebbles, Treasures of the Earth and finally British Offshore Oil and Gas, which opened in 1988.

Treasures of the Earth was the first major museum gallery in the world to integrate computers presenting images and text adjacent to artefacts as part of the information process within the exhibition. The central feature film, Liquid Assets, in the Oil and Gas exhibition was shot and viewed vertically from a circular gallery and won a major award from the IVCA in 1989.

"The Power Within" exhibition on seismology includes a reconstruction of the 1995 Kobe earthquake.

Transfer to the Natural History Museum
Following the relocation of the British Geological Survey's academic activities to Keyworth, the museum was transferred from the custody of the Natural Environment Research Council to the newly independent Natural History Museum. Although an administrative merger with the Natural History Museum had been effected by 1985 (from which time the former Geological Museum was promoted as The Earth Galleries), it was not until 1998 that the previously difficult to find corridor between the two museum buildings was replaced by a new link gallery.  The former Geological Museum galleries are now known as the Red Zone in the Natural History Museum's plans and internal directional signage.

Visions of Earth

Surveys had shown that relatively few visitors navigated the Geological Museum's monumental staircase to the top floors. A major re-ordering of the galleries means that visitors are now encouraged to start their visit at the top of the building by ascending an escalator as part of the visit itinerary.

The former Central Hall of the museum, renamed as Visions of Earth, was transformed in 1996 to a design by Neal Potter. This included the installation of a large escalator (rising eleven metres at a 30° slope) that ascends continuously over two storeys and passes through a model globe. The previously open-sided balconies of the atrium space are now solid walls lined with slabs of recycled slate. These are sand-blasted to show the major stars in the night sky and the planets in the Solar System. When first opened, the globe rotated around the escalator, with dramatic sound effects based on Jimi Hendrix's "Third Stone from the Sun", attempting to give an impression of the flux in the core of the Earth.

The Museums Association's journal Museum Practice reported in 2007 that "the contrast between galleries just before and just after Potter’s arrival (at the Natural History Museum) is like switching over from a television programme made for schools to a big-screen epic, choreographed by Busby Berkeley."

In 2014 the displays in the centre of the atrium were removed and replaced by an original skeleton of a stegosaurus on open display, and in 2015 a new human evolution gallery was opened

See also 
 Museum Lane to the north
 Simpsons of Piccadilly

References 

Museums established in 1835
Museums disestablished in 1988
Natural history museums in England
Geology museums in England
Natural History Museum, London
Museums in the Royal Borough of Kensington and Chelsea
Defunct museums in London
1835 establishments in England